Absolute Grey were an alternative rock–jangle pop band formed in September 1983 in Rochester, New York, United States. The group's original lineup comprised drummer Pat Thomas (who later founded Heyday Records), guitarist Matt Kitchen, vocalist Beth Brown and bassist Mitchell Rasor.

The band's debut release was a six-song cassette, followed by the Green House mini-LP in December 1984. They then signed to Midnight Records, and two years after their debut released What Remains, produced by Tim Lee of The Windbreakers. Thomas left in 1987, later releasing a series of solo albums, and Kitchen also left, leaving Brown and Rasor to continue, with the acoustic Painted Post EP released in mid-1987. A live album recorded in 1984 followed, released on the Greek Di-Di label, before the original line-up came back together to record their final album, Sand Down the Moon.

After disbanding in 1990, an expanded reissue of A Journey Through the Past was released in 2001. In 2003 a remixed edition of Green House: 20th Anniversary Edition with a bonus disc of live recordings was released. The band reunited, and announced plans for a new album in 2004, although nothing was released.

Discography

Albums
Green House (1984), Earring
What Remains (1986), Midnight
A Journey Through the Past (live) (1988), Di-Di
Sand Down the Moon (1989), Di-Di
Green House - 20th Anniversary (2004)

Compilations
Broken Promise (1993)

EP's and singles
Painted Post EP (1987), Midnight

References

External links
 
  Paisley Pop - Greenhouse 20th anniversary reissue label

Alternative rock groups from New York (state)
Jangle pop groups
Musical groups established in 1983
Musical groups disestablished in 1990
1983 establishments in New York (state)
1990 disestablishments in New York (state)